At least three ships of the Hellenic Navy have borne the name Nafkratousa ("She who rules the sea with her ships"):

  a  launched in 1906 and lost in 1921.
  a  launched in 1943 as HMS Battleaxe but renamed HMS Eastway before completion, returned to US control in 1946 and transferred to Greece in 1953. She was scrapped after 1972.
  a  launched in 1945 as USS Fort Mandan transferred to Greece in 1971 and renamed. She was scrapped in 2001.

Hellenic Navy ship names